Ben Cook (born September 29, 1993) is an American professional golfer.

Amateur career
Cook competed for South Christian High School and Ferris State University.

Professional career
Cook turned professional in 2017 and played on the PGA Tour Latinoamérica in 2018. He has worked primarily as a club pro since then.

Cook made the cut on the number at the 2021 PGA Championship, his third appearance at the event. He previously qualified for the 2019 PGA Championship and 2020 PGA Championship, missing the cut both times. Cook finished T44 in 2021 and earned the Crystal Ball as the low PGA Professional.

Cook plays out the Michigan section of the PGA of America. He has also played out of the Northern Ohio section.

Professional wins
2017 Northern Ohio PGA Championship
2018 Michigan PGA Section Assistants Championship, Michigan PGA Championship
2020 Michigan PGA Championship
2021 Michigan PGA Championship

U.S. national team appearances
PGA Cup: 2019 (winners)

References

External links

American male golfers
PGA Tour Latinoamérica golfers
Golfers from Michigan
Ferris State University alumni
Sportspeople from Grand Rapids, Michigan
1993 births
Living people